The 1896 Dartmouth football team represented Dartmouth College as a member of the  Triangular Football League (TFL) during the 1896 college football season. Led by second-year head coach William Wurtenburg, Dartmouth compiled an overall record of 5–2–1 with a mark of 2–0 in TFL play, winning the league title.

The number of games played in 1896 was reduced from the previous season, down to a more normal level of eight. One notable absence from the 1896 schedule was a game against rival Harvard, the only time during Wurtenburg's tenure that the Crimson were not played. The 1896 season was also the most successful, winning percentage-wise during Wurtenburg's time as coach; the team finished the year with a .688 win percentage. Following an initial win against the Worcester Athletic Association, the squad suffered back-to-back shutout losses to Yale and Penn. The remainder of the season, however, was highly successful for the team, and they went 4–0–1 in their final five games. This included defeating both TFL opponents by a combined score of 42–0 for a fourth consecutive championship, and a tie with the Brown team they had lost to the previous year.

Walter McCornack was the team's captain. Several members of the team later became college football coaches, including McCornack, Frank Cavanaugh, John B. Eckstorm, David C. MacAndrew, Joseph H. Edwards, Fred Crolius, and Charles J. Boyle.

Schedule

References

Dartmouth
Dartmouth Big Green football seasons
Dartmouth football